Roger Gaudet (born May 26, 1945) is a Canadian politician and former restaurant owner.

Gaudet served as a councillor in Saint-Liguori from 1985 to 1989. In 1989 he was elected mayor of Saint-Liguoiri, and then in 1993 he became reeve of the Montcalm MRC. In 2002 he was elected to the House of Commons of Canada in a by-election for the Bloc Québécois in the riding Berthier—Montcalm. In the 2004 Canadian federal election he was re-elected- this time in Montcalm. He briefly was the Bloc's critic to Public Works and Government services in 2004.

Gaudet was born  in Saint-Liguori, Quebec.

Electoral record (incomplete)

External links
 

1945 births
Bloc Québécois MPs
Living people
Mayors of places in Quebec
Members of the House of Commons of Canada from Quebec
People from Mascouche
21st-century Canadian politicians